A private museum is a collection, usually on a very limited topic and operated by individual enthusiasts, collectors, clubs or companies.

Overview
Unlike a public or governmental museum, a scientific monitoring and systematic documentation is not always guaranteed. Therefore, a private museum has relevance for historical research only if it complements the national collections. Under certain circumstances, a private museum also receives funding from the state, so that a comparison with public museums is possible.

Many, especially smaller, private museums do not meet the requirements of the International Council of Museums (ICOM). The main reason is that qualified personnel are not sufficiently available or can hardly be financed and therefore often only very limited opening times may be offered.

Often private museums focus on entertainment and have a tourism focus. Their collections are on display for the public to enjoy.

References

External links

 Private Museums, Local Collections. Research Report – a report focusing on people who run private museums in Poland

Types of museums
Collecting